Crockett High School is a public high school located in Crockett, Texas (USA) and classified as a 3A school by the UIL.  It is part of the Crockett Independent School District located in central Houston County.  In 2015, the school was rated "Met Standard" by the Texas Education Agency.

Athletics
The Crockett Bulldogs compete in these sports - 

Cross Country, Volleyball, Football, Basketball, Powerlifting, Golf, Track, Softball & Baseball

State titles
Crockett (UIL)

Baseball 
1982(3A), 1996(3A)

Crockett Bunche (PVIL)
Baseball 
1957(2A-PVIL), 1961(3A-PVIL)
Boys Basketball 
1968(2A-PVIL)

State finalists 
Crockett (UIL)

Football 
1990(3A) 
Boys Basketball 
1998(3A)
Girls Basketball  
2007(3A)
Boys Golf 2014 (3A)

Crockett Bunche (PVIL)

Baseball 
1962(3A-PVIL)
Boys Basketball 
1969(3A-PVIL)

References

External links
Crockett ISD

Schools in Houston County, Texas
Public high schools in Texas
Davy Crockett